Corbera de Llobregat is a municipality situated in the comarca of Baix Llobregat in the province of Barcelona, Catalonia, Spain.

References

External links
 Website of the Municipality of Corbera de Llobregat
 Government data pages 

Municipalities in Baix Llobregat